East Dean is a civil parish and small village in the Test Valley district of Hampshire, England, about  northwest of Romsey. The village is mentioned in the Domesday Book as "Dene", appears as "Estdena" in 1167, and as "Dune" in 1212.

The village is on the right (south) bank of the River Dun. The former Salisbury and Southampton Canal followed the river valley, as does the railway which now forms the Salisbury-Southampton section of the Wessex Main Line.

Church
The parish church of St Winfrith dates in part from the 11th century and is a Grade II* listed building. The church underwent a restoration in 1894–5. The font dates to the 15th century and was brought from West Tytherley. A stained glass window was installed in 1908.

References

Villages in Hampshire

Civil parishes in Hampshire
Test Valley